Kungla is a village in Saaremaa Parish, Saare County, Estonia. it is located on the southern coast of Saaremaa island by the Gulf of Riga. As of 2011 Census, the village's population was 39.

In 2011, the first public harbour in Saaremaa Parish was opened in Kungla village.

References

Villages in Saare County